Pseudochromis chrysospilus, the gold-spotted dottyback, is a species of ray-finned fish from the Indian Ocean around the Socotra Archipelago, which is a member of the family Pseudochromidae.

References

chrysospilus
Taxa named by Anthony C. Gill
Fish described in 2011